Al mahattah may refer to:

Al mahattah, Saudi Arabia
al-Mahattah, Yemen